Plechová kavalérie (English: "Steel Cavalry") is a Czechoslovak television series about combine operators, created by Jaroslav Dietl and directed by Jaroslav Dudek.

Background
Before 1989, many farms in Czechoslovakia did not have enough combine harvesters for the harvest season. They borrowed them from STS (Strojní a Traktorová Stanice), the "Machine and Tractor Station". A route was planned, and the groups of combine harvesters started in the east and harvested farms on the way home. This is the story of one of those groups, from Nepomuk in the Plzeň Region.

Cast and characters
 Jan Hartl as Vít Kubánek
 Jaroslav Moučka as Kahovec
 Vladimír Menšík as Holeček
 Jaromír Hanzlík as Vilda Muclinger
 Vlastimil Hašek as Pravoslav Žížka
 Lenka Kořínková as Zuzana Šímová
 Jan Hrušínský	as Ludvík Kupec
 Jiří Samek as Bohouš Straka
 Václav Sloup as Jindra Kužela
 Libuše Geprtová as Lída
 Vladimír Hlavatý as Knížek
 Marie Motlová	as Knížková
 František Filipovský as Litera

External links
 
 Plechová kavalérie at ČSFD

Czech drama television series
1979 Czechoslovak television series debuts
2006 Czech television series endings
Czechoslovak television series
1970s Czechoslovak television series
1980s Czechoslovak television series
1990s Czech television series
2000s Czech television series
Czechoslovak Television original programming